Arachidonic acid (AA, sometimes ARA) is a polyunsaturated omega-6 fatty acid 20:4(ω-6), or 20:4(5,8,11,14).  It is structurally related to the saturated arachidic acid found in cupuaçu butter.  Its name derives from the New Latin word arachis (peanut), but peanut oil does not contain any arachidonic acid.

Chemistry

In chemical structure, arachidonic acid is a carboxylic acid with a 20-carbon chain and four cis-double bonds; the first double bond is located at the sixth carbon from the omega end.

Some chemistry sources define 'arachidonic acid' to designate any of the eicosatetraenoic acids.  However, almost all writings in biology, medicine, and nutrition limit the term  to all cis-5,8,11,14-eicosatetraenoic acid.

Biology
Arachidonic acid is a polyunsaturated fatty acid present in the phospholipids (especially phosphatidylethanolamine, phosphatidylcholine, and phosphatidylinositides) of membranes of the body's cells, and is abundant in the brain, muscles, and liver. Skeletal muscle is an especially active site of arachidonic acid retention, accounting for roughly 10-20% of the phospholipid fatty acid content typically.

In addition to being involved in cellular signaling as a lipid second messenger involved in the regulation of signaling enzymes, such as PLC-γ, PLC-δ, and PKC-α, -β, and -γ isoforms, arachidonic acid is a key inflammatory intermediate and can also act as a vasodilator. (Note separate synthetic pathways, as described in section below.)

Conditionally essential fatty acid

Arachidonic acid is not one of the essential fatty acids. However, it does become essential if a deficiency in linoleic acid exists or if an inability to convert linoleic acid to arachidonic acid occurs.
Some mammals lack the ability or have a very limited capacity to convert linoleic acid to arachidonic acid, making it an essential part of their diets. Since linoleic acid consumption does not seem to affect levels of arachidonic acid in plasma/serum or erythrocytes, it is uncertain if humans can in fact convert linoleic acid to arachidonic acid. Since little or no arachidonic acid is found in common plants, such animals are obligate carnivores; the cat is a common example of having the inability to desaturate essential fatty acids. A commercial source of arachidonic acid has been derived, however, from the fungus Mortierella alpina.

Biosynthesis and cascade in humans

Arachidonic acid is freed from phospholipid by hydrolysis, catalyzed by the phospholipase A2 (PLA2).

Arachidonic acid for signaling purposes appears to be derived by the action of group IVA cytosolic phospholipase A2 (cPLA2, 85 kDa), whereas inflammatory arachidonic acid is generated by the action of a low-molecular-weight secretory PLA2 (sPLA2, 14-18 kDa).

Arachidonic acid is a precursor to a wide range of eicosanoids:
 The enzymes cyclooxygenase-1 and -2 (i.e. prostaglandin G/H synthase 1 and 2 {PTGS1 and PTGS2}) convert arachidonic acid to prostaglandin G2 and prostaglandin H2, which in turn may be converted to various prostaglandins, to prostacyclin, to thromboxanes, and to the 17-carbon product of thromboxane metabolism of prostaglandin G2/H2, 12-Hydroxyheptadecatrienoic acid (12-HHT).  
 The enzyme 5-lipoxygenase catalyzes the oxidation of arachidonic acid to 5-hydroperoxyeicosatetraenoic acid (5-HPETE), which in turn converts to various leukotrienes (i.e., leukotriene B4, leukotriene C4, leukotriene D4, and leukotriene E4 as well as to 5-hydroxyeicosatetraenoic acid (5-HETE) which may then be further metabolized to 5-HETE's more potent 5-keto analog, 5-oxo-eicosatetraenoic acid (5-oxo-ETE) (also see 5-Hydroxyeicosatetraenoic acid.
 The enzymes 15-lipoxygenase-1 (ALOX15 and 15-lipoxygenase-2 (ALOX15B catalyzes the oxidation of arachidonic acid to 15-hydroperoxyeicosatetraenoic acid (15-HPETE), which may then be further converted to 15-hydroxyeicosatetraenoic acid (15-HETE) and lipoxins; 15-Lipoxygenase-1 may also further metabolize 15-HPETE to eoxins in a pathway analogous to (and presumably using the same enzymes as used in) the pathway which metabolizes 5-HPETE to leukotrienes.
 The enzyme 12-lipoxygenase (ALOX12) catalyzes oxidation of arachidonic acid to 12-hydroperoxyeicosatetraenoic acid (12-HPETE), which may then be metabolized to 12-hydroxyeicosatetraenoic acid (12-HETE) and to hepoxilins.
 Arachidonic acid is also a precursor to anandamide.
 Some arachidonic acid is converted into hydroxyeicosatetraenoic acids (HETEs) and epoxyeicosatrienoic acids (EETs) by epoxygenase.

The production of these derivatives and their actions in the body are collectively known as the "arachidonic acid cascade"; see essential fatty acid interactions and the enzyme and metabolite linkages given in the previous paragraph for more details.

PLA2 activation

PLA2, in turn, is activated by ligand binding to receptors, including:
 5-HT2 receptors 
 mGLUR1
 bFGF receptor
 IFN-α receptor
 IFN-γ receptor

Furthermore, any agent increasing intracellular calcium may cause activation of some forms of PLA2.

PLC activation

Alternatively, arachidonic acid may be cleaved from phospholipids after phospholipase C (PLC) cleaves off the inositol trisphosphate group, yielding diacylglycerol (DAG), which subsequently is cleaved by DAG lipase to yield arachidonic acid.

Receptors that activate this pathway include:
 A1 receptor
 D2 receptor
 α-2 adrenergic receptor
 5-HT1 receptor

PLC may also be activated by MAP kinase. Activators of this pathway include PDGF and FGF.

In the body

Muscle growth
Arachidonic acid promotes the repair and growth of skeletal muscle tissue via conversion to prostaglandin PGF2alpha during and following physical exercise. PGF2alpha promotes muscle protein synthesis by signaling through the Akt/mTOR pathway, similar to leucine, β-hydroxy β-methylbutyric acid (HMB), and phosphatidic acids.

Brain
Arachidonic acid is one of the most abundant fatty acids in the brain, and is present in similar quantities to docosahexaenoic acid (DHA). The two account for about 20% of its fatty-acid content. Like DHA, neurological health is reliant upon sufficient levels of arachidonic acid. Among other things, arachidonic acid helps to maintain hippocampal cell membrane fluidity. It also helps protect the brain from oxidative stress by activating peroxisome proliferator-activated receptor gamma. AA also activates syntaxin-3 (STX-3), a protein involved in the growth and repair of neurons.

Arachidonic acid is also involved in early neurological development. In one study, infants (18 months) given supplemental arachidonic acid for 17 weeks demonstrated significant improvements in intelligence, as measured by the Mental Development Index. This effect is further enhanced by the simultaneous supplementation of AA with DHA.

In adults, the disturbed metabolism of AA may contribute to neuropsychiatric disorders such as Alzheimer's disease and bipolar disorder. There is evidence of significant alterations in the conversion of arachidonic acid to other bioactive molecules (overexpression or disturbances in the AA enzyme cascade) in these conditions.

Alzheimer's disease
The biological roles of arachidonic acid and its metabolites have been explored in the context of various neurodegenerative disorders, including Alzheimer's disease. Dietary supplementation of arachidonic acid during the early stages of Alzheimer's disease has been suggested, but the potential for benefit remains unclear.

Bodybuilding supplement
Arachidonic acid is marketed as an anabolic bodybuilding supplement in a variety of products.

Dietary arachidonic acid and inflammation
Increased consumption of arachidonic acid will not cause inflammation during normal metabolic conditions unless lipid peroxidation products are mixed in. Arachidonic acid is metabolized to both proinflammatory and anti-inflammatory eicosanoids during and after the inflammatory response, respectively. Arachidonic acid is also metabolized to inflammatory and anti-inflammatory eicosanoids during and after physical activity to promote growth. Chronic inflammation from exogenous toxins and excessive exercise should not be confused with acute inflammation from exercise and sufficient rest that is required by the inflammatory response to promote the repair and growth of the micro tears of tissues. However, the evidence is mixed. Some studies giving between 840 mg and 2,000 mg per day to healthy individuals for up to 50 days have shown no increases in inflammation or related metabolic activities. Others show that increased arachidonic acid levels are actually associated with reduced pro-inflammatory IL-6 and IL-1 levels and increased anti-inflammatory tumor necrosis factor-beta. This may result in a reduction in systemic inflammation.

Arachidonic acid does still play a central role in inflammation related to injury and many diseased states. How it is metabolized in the body dictates its inflammatory or anti-inflammatory activity. Individuals with joint pains or active inflammatory disease may find that increased arachidonic acid consumption exacerbates symptoms, presumably because it is being more readily converted to inflammatory compounds. Likewise, high arachidonic acid consumption is not advised for individuals with a history of inflammatory disease, or who are in compromised health. Of note, while AA supplementation does not appear to have proinflammatory effects in healthy individuals, it may counter the anti-inflammatory effects of omega-3 fatty acid supplementation.

Health effects of arachidonic acid supplementation
Arachidonic acid supplementation in daily doses of 1,000–1,500 mg for 50 days has been well tolerated during several clinical studies, with no significant side effects reported. All common markers of health, including kidney and liver function, serum lipids, immunity, and platelet aggregation appear to be unaffected with this level and duration of use. Furthermore, higher concentrations of AA in muscle tissue may be correlated with improved insulin sensitivity. Arachidonic acid supplementation of the diets of healthy adults appears to offer no toxicity or significant safety risk.

While studies looking at arachidonic acid supplementation in sedentary subjects have failed to find changes in resting inflammatory markers in doses up to 1,500 mg daily, strength-trained subjects may respond differently. One study  reported a significant reduction in resting inflammation (via marker IL-6) in young men supplementing 1,000 mg/day of arachidonic acid for 50 days in combination with resistance training. This suggests that rather being pro-inflammatory, supplementation of AA while undergoing resistance training may actually improve the regulation of systemic inflammation.

A meta-analysis  looking for associations between heart disease risk and individual fatty acids reported a significantly reduced risk of heart disease with higher levels of EPA and DHA (omega-3 fats), as well as the omega-6 arachidonic acid. A scientific advisory from the American Heart Association has also favorably evaluated the health impact of dietary omega-6 fats, including arachidonic acid. The group does not recommend limiting this essential fatty acid. In fact, the paper recommends individuals follow a diet that consists of at least 5–10% of calories coming from omega-6 fats, including arachidonic acid. It suggests dietary AA is not a risk factor for heart disease, and may play a role in maintaining optimal metabolism and reduced heart disease risk. Maintaining sufficient intake levels of both omega-3 and omega-6 fatty acids, therefore, is recommended for optimal health.

Arachidonic acid is not carcinogenic, and studies show dietary level is not associated (positively or negatively) with risk of cancers. AA remains integral to the inflammatory and cell growth process, however, which is disturbed in many types of disease including cancer. Therefore, the safety of arachidonic acid supplementation in patients with cancer, inflammatory, or other diseased states is unknown, and supplementation is not recommended.

See also

 Aspirin—inhibits cyclooxygenase enzyme, preventing conversion of arachidonic acid to other signal molecules
 Fish oil
 Polyunsaturated fat
 Polyunsaturated fatty acid

References

External links
 Arachidonic Acid at acnp.org
 

Fatty acids
Alkenoic acids
Arachidonyl compounds